Amy Virginia Talkington (born 1969) is an American filmmaker, screenwriter, and author.

Background 

Talkington was born in Dallas, Texas. Her father, Clement Talkington, is a surgeon; her mother, Virginia Savage McAlester, is an architectural historian and political activist.

Talkington attended the Hockaday School in Dallas and Choate Rosemary Hall in Connecticut. She received her B.A. from Barnard College and her M.F.A. in film directing from Columbia University's School of the Arts.

Filmmaking 
Talkington first received notice for her short films, all of which take as their subject a young and headstrong female protagonist. Number One Fan (1997) won the jury prize at the Hamptons International Film Festival; Second Skin (1998) was in competition the Sundance Film Festival, won several top festival prizes and was acquired by Canal +, HBO, and the Sundance Channel; and Bust (1999) was part of Fox 2000's FXM shorts series. The New Arrival (2000) was the first (and one of the only) films ever made using the “Be Here” 360-degree camera. It premiered at the Cannes Film Festival, was a part of the Sundance Online Film Festival, Rotterdam 
International Film Festival  and became an early example of online, interactive storytelling.

Talkington wrote and directed her first feature, Night of the White Pants, in 2006. The film premiered at the Tribeca Film Festival  and stars Tom Wilkinson, Selma Blair, and Nick Stahl. 
Her recent screenwriting work includes Ungifted, Under Cover, the musical #HotFuss, an adaptation of the memoir Kicked, Bitten, and Scratched, and remakes of the 1980s films Valley Girl  and Private Benjamin.  Talkington is also developing her own novel Liv, Forever.  
She also wrote the screenplays for the TV movies Brave New Girl and Avalon High, for which she won a Writers Guild Award.

Personal life 

Talkington lives in Los Angeles with her husband, record producer and film- music supervisor and editor Robbie Adams. They have two daughters.

Filmography

Features 

 Night of the White Pants - Director/Writer (2004)
 Valley Girl - Writer (2020)

Selected Shorts 

 Number One Fan- Director/Writer (1997) 
 Second Skin- Director/Co-writer (1998) 
 Bust- Director/Writer (1999)
 The New Arrival- Director/Co-writer (2000) 
  Our Very First Sex Tape- Director (2003) 
 Confessions- Writer/Director/Producer (2007)

TV Movies 

 Brave New Girl- Writer/Producer (2004)
 Avalon High- Screenplay adapted from the book by Meg Cabot (2008)

References

External links 
 Personal Website

1969 births
Living people
20th-century American writers
21st-century American writers
Barnard College alumni
Choate Rosemary Hall alumni
Columbia University School of the Arts alumni
Film directors from Texas
Hockaday School alumni
People from Dallas
Screenwriters from Texas